Adult Contemporary is a chart published by Billboard ranking the top-performing songs in the United States in the adult contemporary music (AC) market.  In 2000, seven different songs topped the chart in 52 issues of the magazine, based on weekly airplay data from radio stations compiled by Nielsen Broadcast Data Systems.

In the year's first issue of Billboard the number one song was "I Knew I Loved You" by Savage Garden, which was in its second week at number one.  The Australian duo's song held the top spot for the first 16 weeks of 2000, the longest unbroken run of the year at number one, before being displaced in the issue of Billboard dated April 22 by Faith Hill's song "Breathe".  "I Knew I Loved You" would prove to be one of the most enduring songs in the history of AC radio, and in 2002 it set a new record for the highest total number of weeks spent on Billboards Adult Contemporary chart when it spent its 124th week on the listing, breaking the record set by one of Savage Garden's earlier songs, "Truly Madly Deeply".  Despite also topping the magazine's all-genre chart, the Hot 100, it would prove to be one of Savage Garden's final hits, however, as the duo split up the following year.  Hill's "Breathe" spent one more week at number one than "I Knew I Loved You", albeit non-consecutively.  From April through September the country singer spent 17 weeks at number one in four separate spells.  The song was knocked from the top spot on three separate occasions by "You Sang to Me" by Latin pop star Marc Anthony.  "You Sang to Me" was one of the first English-language hits for Anthony, the biggest-selling artist in the history of salsa music.

In the fall Don Henley spent four weeks at number one with "Taking You Home", from Inside Job, his first album for more than ten years, and the British group BBMak spent seven non-consecutive weeks in the top spot with "Back Here".  BBMak's run at number one was interrupted for one week by Huey Lewis and Gwyneth Paltrow's version of Smokey Robinson's song "Cruisin'", taken from the soundtrack of the film Duets, in which the pair played a father and daughter who performed the song in a karaoke competition.  Veteran singer Lewis had achieved a string of hits with his band Huey Lewis and the News since the early 1980s, including number ones on Billboards rock, AC and dance charts as well as the Hot 100, but "Cruisin'" was the actress Paltrow's first hit as a singer.  The final AC number one of the year was "This I Promise You" by NSYNC, which claimed the top spot in the final issue of Billboard of 2000.

Chart history

See also
2000 in music
List of artists who reached number one on the U.S. Adult Contemporary chart

References

2000
2000 record charts
2000 in American music